, also known by his Chinese style name , was a bureaucrat of the Ryukyu Kingdom.

Tomigusuku Seiryō was the sixth head of an aristocrat family called Mō-uji Tomigusuku Dunchi. He was the eldest son of Tomigusuku Seizoku.

Tomigusuku was elected as a member of Sanshikan in 1627. King Shō Hō dispatched Prince Chatan Chōshū (also known as Shō Kei ) and him in 1638 to celebrate Shimazu Mitsuhisa succeeded as daimyō of Satsuma. Prince Chatan returned to Ryukyu in the next year, but Tomigusuku remained in Satsuma to handle official business. He sailed back to Ryukyu in 1642 but his ship was shipwrecked near Tokunoshima. His body was not found so he had no grave.

References

1586 births
1642 deaths
Ueekata
Sanshikan
Deaths due to shipwreck at sea
People of the Ryukyu Kingdom
Ryukyuan people
16th-century Ryukyuan people
17th-century Ryukyuan people